Olav Zanetti (born 29 April 1976) is a retired Norwegian football defender.

He went from Skjetten SK's junior team to its senior team in 1994. He later played professionally for three seasons in Lillestrøm SK, four in Hønefoss BK and five in Sandefjord. Here he became runner-up in the 2006 Norwegian Football Cup Final. He finished his career in IF Fram Larvik and IL Stjørdals-Blink.

References

1976 births
Living people
People from Skedsmo
Norwegian footballers
Skjetten SK players
Lillestrøm SK players
Hønefoss BK players
Sandefjord Fotball players
IF Fram Larvik players
IL Stjørdals-Blink players
Norwegian First Division players
Eliteserien players
Association football defenders
Sportspeople from Viken (county)